The 1944 All-Big Six Conference football team consists of American football players chosen by various organizations for All-Big Six Conference teams for the 1944 college football season.  The selectors for the 1944 season included the United Press (UP).

All-Big Six selections

Backs
 Derald Lebow, Oklahoma (UP-1)
 Bill Dellastatious, Missouri (UP-1)
 Paul Collins, Missouri (UP-1)
 Meredith Warner, Iowa State (UP-1)

Ends
 Dub Wooton, Oklahoma (UP-1)
 Merle Dinkins, Oklahoma (UP-1)

Tackles
 Jim Kekeris, Missouri (UP-1)
 John Harley, Oklahoma (UP-1)

Guards
 John Fathauer, Iowa State (UP-1)
 Charles Wright, Iowa State (UP-1)

Centers
 Bob Mayfield, Oklahoma (UP-1)

Key
UP = United Press

See also
1944 College Football All-America Team

References

All-Big Six Conference football team
All-Big Eight Conference football teams